Pharmacophagus antenor, the Madagascar giant swallowtail, is a butterfly from the family Papilionidae. As the common name implies, it is large (12– to 14-cm wingspan) and endemic to Madagascar. It is the only species in the genus Pharmacophagus.

The larvae feed on Aristolochia acuminata and Quisqualis grandidieri.

Further reading 
 Hancock, E.G., Broadsmith-Brown, G., Douglas, A.S. & Vane-Wright, R.I. 2008. William Hunter's Museum and discovery of the Madagascan pipevine swallowtail butterfly, Pharmacophagus antenor (Drury, 1773). Antenna, Chiswell Green32(1): 10–17.

External links 
 Fiebig
 Larval stages

Papilionidae
Butterflies described in 1775
Taxa named by Erich Haase
Monotypic butterfly genera